Town Hall Concert is a 1964 live album by the jazz bassist and composer Charles Mingus. It was recorded in New York City at The Town Hall on April 4, 1964. "So Long Eric" is a 12-bar blues that got its name after Eric Dolphy informed Mingus he would be leaving the band to stay in Europe before a concert in Oslo. "Praying With Eric" is more commonly known as "Meditations On Integration". The album was originally released on Mingus' own Jazz Workshop label and subsequently rereleased on Fantasy as part of their Original Jazz Classics series.

Track listing

All songs written by Charles Mingus.

 "So Long Eric" – 17:48
 "Praying With Eric" – 27:31

Personnel

Charles Mingus – bass
Eric Dolphy – alto saxophone, bass clarinet, flute
Johnny Coles – trumpet
Clifford Jordan – tenor saxophone
Jaki Byard – piano
Dannie Richmond – drums

References

1964 live albums
Charles Mingus live albums
Fantasy Records live albums